Deran or DeRan or Dar An or Doran may refer to:

Places
 Deran, Gilan, village in Masal County, Gilan Province, Iran
 Doran, Kerman, village in Kerman County, Kerman Province, Iran

Surname
 Burhânettin Deran (1902–1965), Turkish composer and performer
 James J. DeRan Jr. (1906–1986), American politician

Given name
 Deran Sarafian, American director and actor
 Deran Toksöz (born 1988), German footballer

Other
 Deran (album), album by singer Bombino

See also
 Daran, Iran, capital city of Fereydan County, Isfahan Province